The 1952–53 season was Real Madrid Club de Fútbol's 50th season in existence and the club's 21st consecutive season in the top flight of Spanish football.

Summary
During Summer Juan Antonio Ipiña took the job as new coach. The squad reached a decent third place on League table three points below Champions FC Barcelona. Striker Pahiño chose to not renew his contract and left the club towards Deportivo La Coruña on 1 August 1953. under pressure President Santiago Bernabéu reached and agreement with Joseíto and the forward chose to remain another season.

In June, the squad reached 1953 Copa del Generalísimo semi-finals being defeated after two matches by Atletico Bilbao with a 3–4 aggregate score.

Squad

Transfers

Competitions

La Liga

League table

Position by round

Matches

Copa del Generalísimo

Eightfinals

Quarter-finals

Semi-finals

Statistics

Squad statistics

Players statistics

References

Real Madrid CF seasons
Real Madrid CF